The regular season of the 2021–22 NBL season, the 44th season of the National Basketball League (Australia), started on 3 December 2021, with ten teams participating. It consisted of 140 games spread across 21 rounds, with the final game being played on 24 April 2022. 

On 24 April 2022, Melbourne United claimed their 6th regular season championship.

Games

Round 1

Round 2

Round 3

Round 4

Round 5

Round 6

Round 7

Round 8

Round 9

Round 10

Round 11

Round 12

Round 13

Round 14

Round 15

Round 16

Round 17

Round 18

Round 19

Round 20

Round 21

Ladder

References

External links

 

regular season
2021–22 in Australian basketball